Heteropogon is a genus of annual and perennial plants in the grass family known generally as tangleheads, widespread primarily in tropical and subtropical regions.

Tangleheads are erect tussock grasses with paired spikelets. Lower pairs are equal in size (homogamous units), and upper pairs include one awned bisexual spikelet and one awnless sterile spikelet (heterogamous units).

The name of the genus is derived from the Greek words έτερος (héteros), meaning "different," and πώγων (pôgôn), meaning "beard."

 Species
 Heteropogon contortus (L.) P.Beauv. ex Roem. & Schult. - Africa, southern Asia, southwestern Europe (Spain, France, Italy, Switzerland, Balkans), Mesoamerica, West Indies, tropical South America, southern United States (CA AZ NM TX FL HI), various oceanic islands
 Heteropogon fischerianus Bor - Tamil Nadu
 Heteropogon melanocarpus (Elliott) Benth. - Mesoamerica, West Indies, tropical South America, southern United States (AZ TX AL FL GA NC SC), Africa, Madagascar, Yunnan, India, Oman
 Heteropogon polystachyus (Roxb.) Schult. - Tamil Nadu
 Heteropogon ritchiei (Hook.f.) Blatt. & McCann - India, Myanmar
 Heteropogon triticeus (R.Br.) Stapf ex Craib - Southeast Asia, New Guinea, Queensland, Hainan, India, Sri Lanka

 Formerly included
see Agenium Dichanthium Diectomis Diheteropogon Elymandra Hyparrhenia Parahyparrhenia Trachypogon

Gallery

References

External links

Panicoideae
Poaceae genera